Leucotmemis simillima is a moth of the subfamily Arctiinae. It was described by Max Wilhelm Karl Draudt in 1931. It is found in Brazil.

References

 

Leucotmemis
Moths described in 1931